Elachista canis is a moth in the family Elachistidae. It was described by Parenti in 1983. It is found in Japan (Hokkaidô, Honshû, Kyûshû, Ryûkyû) and the Russian Far East (Sakhalin).

The length of the forewings is 3.1–4.3 mm for males and 3.5–4.4 mm for females. The forewings are blackish, sparsely mottled with greyish bases of scales in males and slightly lustrous in females. There are three silvery markings, as well as a transverse fascia from the costal margin, often reaching the hindmargin. There is also a triangular costal spot and a triangular tornal spot. The hindwings are dark greyish, tinged with brown. Adults have been recorded on wing in early July.

The larvae feed on Sasa, Pleioblastus and Bambusa species, as well as Eccoilopus cotulifer. They mine the leaves of their host plant. The mine starts as a sinuate-linear gallery. After hibernation, the larva continues mining, broadening and extending the mine towards the leaf-base. It finally becomes an elongate blotch. Pupation takes place inside the mine.

References

Moths described in 1983
canis
Moths of Japan
Moths of Asia